Fergus Bell (born 25 January 1991) is a former English footballer who played as a midfielder for Jerez Industrial, Mechelen, Heist, Monza, Mansfield Town, Yeovil Town and Torquay United. Bell currently operates as a property developer.

Career

Early career
Bell played youth football with Sunderland and Hibernian. He was a member of the Hibernian youth side that won the under-19 league and Scottish Youth Cup double in the 2008–09 season, scoring five goals during the cup run. He was also a member of Hibs' East of Scotland Shield winning side in 2008–09. Bell was one of six players in the side who were given new contracts by Hibs following their success. However, Bell left Hibernian in 2010 without making a senior appearance for the club.

Jerez Industrial
In September 2010, Bell joined the Glenn Hoddle Academy in Spain, which aimed to offer a route back to professional football for players released by their clubs. Six days later, the academy took over Spanish club Jerez Industrial in the fourth-tier Tercera División, giving Bell the opportunity to play senior football. He went on to make 26 league appearances, scoring 5 goals, but could not prevent relegation after the club received a points deduction. By the end of the season the academy had cut ties with Jerez Industrial and relocated to the UK. After leaving Spain, Bell had a trial spell with Blackburn Rovers, but was not offered a contract.

Mechelen
Bell moved to Mechelen in the Belgian Third Division during the 2012–13 season, although his spell at the club was disrupted by injuries. After a conflict with manager Thierry Pister, Bell's contract was terminated.

KSK Heist
In July 2013, Bell signed for Heist in the Belgian Second Division. He played one game for the club, a 7–2 defeat at home to Royal Antwerp.

A.C. Monza Brianza 1912 
After just seven weeks at KSK Heist, Bell signed for Italian Lega Pro Seconda Divisione club Monza along with Alex Fisher, who had now been a teammate of Bell's at each of his four clubs.

He made two league appearances for the Biancorossi, making a further four appearances in the Coppa Italia Lega Pro as Monza reached the final.

Mansfield Town 
In July 2014 Bell joined Mansfield Town, along with Alex Fisher. Bell went on to make 21 appearances in all competitions.

Yeovil Town 
On 29 January 2015, Bell signed for League One side Yeovil Town until the end of the season, having been released from his contract with Mansfield. He made just two league appearances for the club, although he also featured in Yeovil's Somerset Premier Cup campaign where he scored two goals in the semi-final. He was released at the end of the season following Yeovil's relegation to League Two.

Torquay United 
On 19 September 2015, Bell signed for National League side Torquay United on non-contract terms. Bell made six appearances for the Gulls before being released by manager Kevin Nicholson, who described Bell as being on an 'unsustainable deal' and saying the player was 'losing money every day just turning up'.

References

External links

1991 births
Living people
Footballers from Wandsworth
English footballers
Association football midfielders
K.R.C. Mechelen players
Jerez Industrial CF players
Hibernian F.C. players
Sunderland A.F.C. players
A.C. Monza players
Mansfield Town F.C. players
Yeovil Town F.C. players
Torquay United F.C. players
English Football League players
National League (English football) players
English expatriate footballers
K.S.K. Heist players